The Dan David Prize is a major international award that recognizes and supports outstanding contributions to the study of history and other disciplines that shed light on the human past. It awards nine prizes of $300,000 each year to outstanding early- and mid-career scholars and practitioners in the historical disciplines. The Prize has an annual purse of $3 million, making it the largest history award in the world, with the remaining $300,000 funding an international postdoctoral fellowship program at Tel Aviv University, where the Prize is headquartered. The Prize is endowed by the Dan David Foundation.

Until 2021 the Prize awarded 3 annual prizes of $1 million for innovative and interdisciplinary research in three time dimensions: Past, Present and Future. Prize laureates donated 10 percent of their prize money to doctoral scholarships for outstanding Ph.D. students and postdoctoral scholarships in their own field from around the world.

In September 2021, the Dan David Prize announced that it would shift its focus to support the work of historians, art historians, archaeologists, digital humanists, curators, documentary filmmakers and all those who deepen our knowledge and understanding of the past.

History
The Dan David Foundation was founded in 2000 with a $100 million endowment by Romanian-born Israeli businessman and philanthropist Dan David.

Laureates include cellist Yo-Yo Ma (2006), Israeli author Amos Oz (2008), U.S. Vice President Al Gore (2008), Canadian author Margaret Atwood (2010), French economist Esther Duflo,  and immunologist Dr. Anthony Fauci (2021).

In 2016, Catherine Hall of University College London rejected the Dan David Prize. Her prize money was donated to fund scholarships at Tel Aviv University.

Transition to the new prize 
The Dan David Prize was founded with the goal of rewarding and encouraging innovative and interdisciplinary research that cuts across traditional boundaries and paradigms.

Each year, three prizes of $1 million were awarded in rotating fields to those who made outstanding contributions to humanity.  

In anticipation of the Prize’s 20th anniversary in 2021, the Dan David Prize set out in a new direction, citing the decline of global investment in the humanities and the relative scarcity of major prizes in the humanities. The redesigned  prize focuses on supporting outstanding research in the historical disciplines and celebrating scholars and practitioners whose work illuminates the human past and enriches public debate with a deeper understanding of history.

The Prize announced that starting in 2022 it would  award up to nine prizes of $300,000 each year to early- and mid-career scholars and practitioners around the world to recognize significant achievements in the study of the past and support the winners’ future endeavours. From 2022, there will no longer be a distinction between three prize categories.

Winners (from 2022) 
From 2022 recipients of the Prize were called winners rather than laureates. The first cohort of Prize winners was announced on March 1, 2022.

Laureates (2002-2021)

See also 

 List of history awards

References

External links
 – includes complete list of all laureates by year.

International awards
Israeli awards
Awards established in 2002
2002 establishments in Israel